OPPI may refer to:
 Ontario Professional Planners Institute
 the ICAO code for Pasni Airport, a domestic airport located at Pasni City, Balochistan, Pakistan